Domenico Maria Gelmini (29 December 1807 − 25 January 1888) was an Italian Roman Catholic bishop.

Ordained to the priesthood on 18 September 1830, Gelmini was named bishop of the Roman Catholic Diocese of Lodi, Italy in November 1871 and died on 25 January 1888 while still in office.

References

1807 births
1888 deaths
People from the Province of Lodi
Bishops of Lodi